Jafarabad (also Romanized as Ja‘farābād; also known as Ja‘farābād-e Mūghār Persian:جعفرآباد موغار) is a village in Garmsir Rural District, in the Central District of Ardestan County, Isfahan Province, Iran. At the 2006 census, its population was 183, in 45 families.

References 

Populated places in Ardestan County